TeTori "Tori" Elsie Dixon (born August 4, 1992) is an American indoor volleyball player, and was part of the United States national team that won the 2014 World Championship gold medal.

Career

College
She played college volleyball for the University of Minnesota Golden Gophers women's volleyball team. Dixon was Selected AVCA All-America First-Team a unanimous All-Big Ten. She finished her career ranked fifth all time in total blocks (507), the best ever career hitting percentage (.369) and ninth all-time in career kills (1,479).

International
Dixon was part of the USA national team that won the 2014 World Championship gold medal when the team defeated China 3-1 in the final match. Dixon was named Best Middle Blocker at the 2014 Women's Pan-American Volleyball Cup.

Dixon played for Rabita Baku for the 2014/15 season, taking part of the Women's CEV Champions League and Azerbaijan Women's Volleyball Super League. She then played for the Japanese club Toray Arrows for the 2015/16 season. In 2019 she played for Beijing BAIC Motor China Volleyball League.

In May 2021, she was named to the 18-player roster for the FIVB Volleyball Nations League tournament. that will be played May 25 – June 24 in Rimini, Italy. It is the only major international competition before the Tokyo Olympics in July.

Awards

Individual
 2015 FIVB World Cup "Best Middle Blockers"
 2018 Nations League "Best Middle Blockers"
 2018–19 Chinese Volleyball League "Most Valuable Player"

Personal
Dixon is the daughter of former National Football League player David Dixon. She is of Maori descent.

References

1992 births
Living people
American women's volleyball players
Minnesota Golden Gophers women's volleyball players
American expatriate sportspeople in Japan
Middle blockers
Expatriate volleyball players in Azerbaijan
American expatriate sportspeople in Azerbaijan
Expatriate volleyball players in Japan
Sportspeople from Arizona
American people of Māori descent
Expatriate volleyball players in Italy
American expatriate sportspeople in Italy
American expatriate sportspeople in China